Carlo Recalcati (born September 11, 1945 in Milan, Italy) is an Italian professional basketball coach, and a former player.

He was the head coach of the senior Italian national basketball team, from 2001 to 2009, and led them to the silver medal at the 2004 Summer Olympic Games, and the bronze medal at the EuroBasket 2003.

Playing career
As a player on the club level, Recalcati played for Pallacanestro Cantù (1962–1979, winning the Italian League championship in 1968 and 1975), and Pallacanestro Parma (1979–1981). He also played for the senior Italian national team, from 1967 to 1975 (winning the bronze at EuroBasket 1971 and EuroBasket 1975).

Coaching career
As a basketball coach, Recalcati coached Pallacanestro Parma (1980–81), Alpe Bergamo (1982–84), Pallacanestro Cantù (1984–90, reached the final in the FIBA Korać Cup in the 1988–89 season), Viola Reggio Calabria (1990–95), Teorematour Milano (1995), Pallacanestro Varese (1997–1999, won the Italian League championship in the 1998–99 season), Fortitudo Bologna (1999–01, won the Italian League championship in the 1999–00 season), and Montepaschi Siena (2003–06, won the Italian League championship in the 2003–04 season, and the Italian Supercup, in the 2004–05 season.

On January 16, 2018, Recalcati became the new head coach of Fiat Torino.

Orders
 Order of Merit of the Italian Republic, 4th Class: 2004

References

External links 
 Recalcati page on the official Serie A website 

1945 births
Living people
Basketball players at the 1968 Summer Olympics
Basketball players at the 1976 Summer Olympics
Competitors at the 2005 Mediterranean Games
Fortitudo Pallacanestro Bologna coaches
Italian basketball coaches
Italian men's basketball players
1967 FIBA World Championship players
1970 FIBA World Championship players
Medalists at the 2004 Summer Olympics
Mediterranean Games gold medalists for Italy
Mediterranean Games medalists in basketball
Mens Sana Basket coaches
Auxilium Pallacanestro Torino coaches
Olympic basketball players of Italy
Olympic silver medalists for Italy
Pallacanestro Cantù coaches
Pallacanestro Cantù players
Pallacanestro Varese coaches
Reyer Venezia coaches
Shooting guards
Small forwards
Basketball players from Milan